Asimov's Guide to Shakespeare (1970) by Isaac Asimov is a two-volume guide to the works of the celebrated English writer William Shakespeare. The numerous maps were drafted by the artist Rafael Palacios.

Structure
The work gives a short guide to every Shakespeare play, as well as two epic poems. Asimov organizes the plays not in the usual way – as tragedies, comedies, and histories – but regionally, as follows:
 Greek
 Roman
 Italian
 English

The last two categories are treated broadly; 'Italian' applies to neighbouring countries, and both Hamlet and Macbeth are listed with 'The English Plays'. Asimov gives a detailed justification for doing this.

Within each category, the plays are arranged according to internal (historical) chronology, making allowance for the several not based on actual events. Asimov notes how much is real history, and describes who the historical people were, where applicable. He traces those characters who appear in more than one play, and provides maps to explain key geographical elements.

Reception
Asimov's approach is not popular with some readers' prejudices:

Publication data
Asimov's Guide to Shakespeare, vols I and II (1970), . Gramercy Books.

Nearly 800 pages long plus an index, the work was originally published in two volumes; Greek, Roman and Italian in the first and 'The English Plays' in the second.

Asimov dedicated the work to his late father, Judah Asimov.

See also
 Isaac Asimov bibliography (chronological)

Notes and references

Sources
 
 

1970 non-fiction books
Books by Isaac Asimov
Doubleday (publisher) books
American non-fiction books
Works about William Shakespeare